The MP 18, manufactured by Theodor Bergmann Abteilung Waffenbau, was arguably the first submachine gun used in combat. It was introduced into service in 1918 by the German Army during World War I as the primary weapon of the Sturmtruppen, assault groups specialized in trench combat. Although MP 18 production ended in the 1920s, its design formed the basis of most submachine guns manufactured between 1920 and 1960.

History

What became known as the "submachine gun" had its genesis in the early 20th century and developed around the concepts of fire and movement and infiltration tactics, specifically for the task of clearing trenches of enemy soldiers, an environment within which engagements were unlikely to occur beyond a range of a few feet.

In 1915, the German Rifle Testing Commission at Spandau decided to develop a new weapon for trench warfare. An attempt to modify existing semi-automatic pistols (specifically the Luger and C96 Mauser) failed, as accurate aimed fire in full automatic mode was impossible due to their light weights and high rates of fire of 1,200 rounds per minute. The commission determined that a completely new kind of weapon was needed. Hugo Schmeisser, working for the Bergmann Waffenfabrik, was part of a team composed of Theodor Bergmann and a few other technicians. They designed a new type of weapon to fulfill the requirements, which was designated the Maschinenpistole 18/I. It is not clear whether the I stands for the number 1 or the letter I, although its successor (the MP28) was designated the Maschinenpistole 28/II (suggesting the former).

Full-scale production began in early 1918. Though technically not the world's first submachine gun, being beaten by the double-barreled Italian Villar Perosa of 1915, in modern usage of the term the MP 18 is considered the world's first submachine gun, since the Villar Perosa had been designed to be used as a light machine gun on aircraft before it was adapted to infantry use as a single-barreled shoulder-fired weapon (the Beretta SMG) in late 1918.

Service history

The MP 18 served in the final stages of World War I in 1918, especially in the Kaiserschlacht offensive. More than 25,000 were produced, until the Treaty of Versailles banned production of military SMGs in 1920.

The MP 18 proved to be an excellent weapon. Its concept was well-proven in trench fighting. The basic design directly influenced later submachine gun designs and showed its superiority over the regular infantry rifle in urban, mobile, and guerrilla warfare. The MP 18 served with German police and paramilitary forces after the end of the war. It was widely used in combat by the Freikorps Von Epp against the Spartacus League in Bavaria and by other Freikorps in Berlin, where its efficiency in urban combat was demonstrated.

During the failed 1924 coup in Estonia the MP18 was used to defend the Tallin barracks from Communist militants; some of which were armed with Thompson submachineguns. This was possibly the first engagement where submachineguns were used on both sides.

All the limited conflicts between 1920 and 1940 saw an increasing use of this new class of weapons, first in South America during the Chaco War, then in Europe during the Spanish Civil War, and in China during the Warlord Era and the Japanese invasion, where its use by well-trained Chinese troops was costly for the invaders as in the Battle of Shanghai. It was also used during World War II by various partisans and resistance forces.

Since the treaty allowed the Weimar Republic to keep a small quantity of submachine guns for police use, a few hundred MP 18.1s were modified to accept Schmeisser's original 20-round magazine design. This modification, conducted by Haenel Waffenfabrik, required removal of the existing magazine well collar, and replacement with a different one. These weapons were overstamped with the date "1920" on the receiver and magazine well to show they were legitimate weapons owned by the Weimar Republic and not war bringbacks or clandestine weapons.

Bergmann sold the licence of the MP 18. 1 to SIG Switzerland; the Swiss made model was known as the SIG Bergmann 1920. It existed in .30 Luger and 7.63 mm Mauser. The Bergmann MP 18.1 represents a milestone both in terms of armament technology and warfare tactics. It opened the way for a whole new class of weapons and triggered the research for lighter automatic firearms to be used by mobile troops. Its first direct competitors did not see service in World War I, but most of them saw use in all the limited conflicts taking place in the inter-war period.

Evolution

The French, despite being moderately interested by this class of armament because they had designed and introduced in service many semi-automatic and automatic weapons, immediately launched studies based on captured MP 18s. The design of the STA 1922 was adopted and the MAS 1924 or 9 mm STA Modèle 1924 entered service and was used in colonial conflicts in Morocco. Around 1,000 were produced and these rifles, as well as ex-German captured MP 18s, saw limited service during World War II.

China produced many copies of the SIG Bergmann at various factories, including the arsenals at Tsing Tao, Dagu, and Hanyang. The production was decentralized, and each factory's version exhibited differences from one another; the guns produced at Tsing Tao and Dagu had a bottom-mounted magazine. Large numbers of the Tsing Tao submachine gun were made, and use by Chinese Republican troops from the mid-1920s to the 1940s. 

.During the 1920s Chicago gun dealer Vincent Daniels imported 7.65mm SIG Bergmann submachine guns and installed a two-position fire-selector behind the end cap of the receiver. This arrangement was somewhat similar to the later Lanchester submachine gun. The guns were sold under the name "Daniels Rapid-Fire Carbine" and were bought by members of the Northside Gang and the Chicago Outfit.

The MP 28 was produced by C. G. Haenel under the supervision of Schmeisser and was produced under license by Etablissements Pieper in Belgium. It was copied by the Second Spanish Republic under the codename Naranjero. The Naranjero was chambered in 9mm Largo.

The Austrian Steyr MP 34 was created by a team of technicians led by Louis Stange who designed a submachine gun for Rheinmetall in 1919 and used Bergmann's MG 15 to design the MG 30. The SIG Bergmann 1920 was used by Finland, Japan, and Estonia and was the inspiration for the Estonian Tallinn 1923, the Japanese Type 100 submachine gun and the Finnish Suomi model 31, which in turn inspired Degtyarev for his PPD 34.

Emil Bergmann, Theodor Bergmann's son, designed the MP 32 that evolved into the MP 34 as adopted by Denmark before receiving the MP35 name when adopted by nascent Wehrmacht in 1935. This submachine gun is often mistaken for the Mitraillette 34, an MP 28 made in Belgium by Pieper Bayard, former Bergmann licensed manufacturer or with the MP34 made by Steyr. It is easy to identify the Bergmann MP 32/34/35 or its final version 35/1 since the cocking lever works exactly like a rifle bolt.

In 1940, with a pressing need for individual automatic weapons, the British copied the MP 28 and developed the Lanchester submachine gun for the Royal Navy. Solidly built with the use of brass for the magazine well, and a bayonet mount, it entered service in 1940. The magazine and the bolt of the MP 28 could be used in the Lanchester. The British Sten used the side-mounted magazine configuration and a simplified version of the open-bolt firing operating system of the MP 28.

The OVP 1918, an offspring of Revelli's Villar Perosa 1915, inspired Heinrich Vollmer for his telescopic bolt used in the VPM 1930, EMP, MP 38, MP 40 and MP 41. The MP 18 remained in limited service with the German armed forces during the Second World War, specifically with the Sicherheitsdienst, later eastern foreign divisions of the Waffen SS and also with Kriegsmarine coastal artillery units.

The Soviet Union made a similar use of MP 28 design in their PDD-34 sub machine gun in 1934. Further development of the PPD-34 led to the simplified PPD-40 and PPSh-41.

Design details
The MP 18 was a heavy weapon, weighing over  when fully loaded. The receiver tube was very thick (around 3 mm), compared with later World War II submachine guns with half that thickness or less, such as the Sten gun or MP 40.

Though Schmeisser designed a conventional 20-round-capacity "box" magazine for the weapon, the testing commission, for practical reasons, insisted that the MP 18 be adapted to use the 32-round TM 08 Luger "snail" drum magazine that was widely used with the long-barreled version of the Luger pistol.

Like many other open-bolt designs, the MP 18 was prone to accidental discharge. If the buttstock of a loaded gun was given a hard knock while the bolt was fully forward, the gun could accidentally fire because of the bolt overcoming the action spring resistance and moving rearward enough to pick up a round, chamber it and fire. Soldiers liked to leave the bolt of their firearm in this closed or forward position, so dirt and debris would not enter the barrel and chamber. This "bolt-closure" practice acted as a dust cover for the weapon's chamber, preventing a malfunction from occurring because of the presence of debris, but making accidental discharge more likely.

The German police asked for external safeties on their MP 18s, and universal bolt-locking safeties were added on all the submachine guns used by the police. Later submachine gun designs like the Sten and the MP 40 were modified to allow the cocking handle to be pushed inwards to lock the closed bolt to the tubular receiver casing. This design change prevented accidental discharges when the bolt was left forward and a loaded magazine was inserted.

Operation

The MP 18 submachine gun is a simple blowback operated weapon firing from the open bolt. The original MP 18.1 was designed to use the snail drum magazine of the Luger Artillery model pistol. This rotary design type of magazine holds 32 rounds of 9 mm Parabellum, the user having to load the magazine with a proprietary loading tool. A special sleeve was required when the snail drum was used on the MP 18 to stop the snail drum from being inserted too far in the magazine well.

After 1920, the MP 18 was modified to use a straight magazine similar to those used in the later developed MP 40 submachine gun. The MP 18 could only fire in the fully automatic mode. Its successor, the MP 28/2, received a modified mechanism with a selector for single shot or fully automatic fire.

Users 

: MP-28 produced under license and adopted as MI-34 (Mitraillette Modèle 1934)
:MP18,  MP-28, SIG Bergmann 1920
:MP-28 adopted by the São Paulo police in 1934, and still in use in the late 70s The MP18 was used by the Pernambuco police,  a MP18 with a 50-round magazine was borrowed by Lieutenant João Bezerra of the Alagoas police and used in the 1938 Angico Raid where Lampião was killed
: Some evidence that captured MP 18s in use with Alberta Provincial Police
: Used locally made versions of the MP 18, MP 28 and Swiss-made SIG Bergmann 1920 in 7.63×25mm Mauser
: MP-28s were likely either purchased as surplus or given as aid by Nazi Germany. Two Ethiopian MP/28s in British possession would inspire the later Lanchester submachine gun. 
:The MP18 was used to defend the Tallin barracks during the 1924 communist uprising Estonian police purchased an unknown amount of guns from the Finnish Lindelöf  factory 
: 1,523 SIG M/20s in 7.65×21mm Luger were bought between 1922 and 1940 During the Winter War, 171 MP-28s were bought from Belgium; but they did not arrive in time. These guns were later issued in the Continuation War to units in Lapland, home front troops and supply corps. The Leonard Lindelöf company started to manufacture  licensed copies of the M/20 in 1922 it is estimated 60 or 70 guns were made in total; those were of inferior quality and the magazines were not interchangeable. The production suffered multiple delays, in 1925 the first guns were completed and small amounts were sold to police, coastal guard, local civil guard organizations and customs. 12 were acquired by the civil guard in 1932 as a pledge from a failed contract. 
:After WW1 a small amount was surrendered by Germany; they were still in inventory in 1939
:

: Used by the police after WWI.

: ex-Japanese Swiss-made guns
:The MP28 was purchased before WW2 and used during the Iran crisis of 1946.
: 9 were in inventory in 1940
: Used Swiss-made SIG M/20 in 7.63×25mm Mauser and used against the Chinese
: approx. 6 Bergmann MP-18s in the stock of the Latvian Army by April 1936

: SIG M/20 supplied by Japan
:MP28 used by KNIL
: The Assault Group of the Norwegian Police Service acquired 26 SIG Bergmann 1920 submachine guns in 1937
:Purchased a few MP 28s before the Chaco War, later captured more from Bolivian forces.SIG Bergmannnscaptured from Bolivia
:MP28 in 7.65mm manufactured at Braço de Prata starting in 1929, it was issued to the army and public security police
: Small numbers of MP18 and MP28/II submachineguns were used by police units in the interwar years Large numbers of MP 28/II submachine guns were supplied to the Iron Guard by the Sicherheitsdienst, used by the army after the Iron Guard Rebellion
: Used by Reinsurance division (Security division) in Belorussia and Ukraine against pro-Soviet partisans 
: Korean Liberation Army used in Second Sino-Japanese War received by National Revolutionary Army
: MP 28s produced under license
:25 SIG Bergmanns in 7.65mm were trialed by the army, but were not adopted. The Zurich police adopted the SIG Bergmann in 9mm Parabellum.
:The SIG Bergmann was adopted by police. It was also used for executions until the 1980s, when it was replaced by the MP5SD

Notes

Bibliography

Further reading
 Clinton Ezell, Edward. Small arms of the world, Eleventh Edition, Arms & Armour Press, London, 1977

 de Vries, G.; Martens, B.J. The MP 38, 40, 40/1 and 41 Submachine gun, Propaganda Photos Series, Volume 2, Special Interest Publicaties BV, Arnhem, The Netherlands. First Edition 2001
 Gotz, Hans Dieter, German Military Rifles and Machine Pistols, 1871–1945, Schiffer Publishing, Ltd. West Chester, Pennsylvania, 1990. 
 Günter Wollert;  Reiner Lidschun;  Wilfried Kopenhagen, Illustrierte Enzyklopädie der Schützenwaffen aus aller Welt: Schützenwaffen heute (1945-1985), Berlin : Militärverlag der Deutschen Demokratischen Republik, 1988. 
 Smith, W.H.B, Small arms of the world: the basic manual of military small arms, Harrisburg, Pa.: Stackpole Books, 1955.

External links

MP 18.1 Video, Informations and Pictures 
A Bergmann MP 18 built in Tsing Tao, China in 1927
Historic Arms
MP18
Small Arms Review: The MP28,II Successor of the MP18,I
Luger Artillery and Mauser Parabellum - Trommelmagazine use
YouTube Animation showing mechanism of MP18.1

1918 establishments in Germany
1920s disestablishments in Germany
7.63×25mm Mauser submachine guns
7.65×21mm Parabellum submachine guns
9mm Parabellum submachine guns
Firearms by Hugo Schmeisser
Simple blowback firearms
Submachine guns of Germany
Weapons and ammunition introduced in 1918
World War I German infantry weapons
Weapons of the Ottoman Empire
World War I submachine guns
World War II infantry weapons of China
World War II infantry weapons of Germany
World War II submachine guns